Monica Strebel is a Swiss actress, mainly active in Italian cinema.

Strebel's first starring role was in 1968, in Amore o qualcosa del genere, and her performance was well received by critics. She later starred in a number of Italian films, including Fernando Di Leo's Brucia, ragazzo, brucia and Francesco Maselli's Lettera aperta a un giornale della sera.

References

External links 

 

Swiss film actresses
Living people
Year of birth missing (living people)